Green Hill is a rural locality in the Cairns Region, Queensland, Australia.

Geography 
Pine Creek Yarrabah Road forms the western boundary of the locality, while the eastern boundary is formed by the ridgeline of the Malbon Thompson Range. The land in the west of the locality is lower-lying (10–50 metres above sea level) freehold land used for agriculture (predominantly sugarcane) and some rural residences.

The north-east of the locality is protected as the Malbon Thompson Forest Reserve, while the south-east of the locality is the Grey Peaks National Park. There are no access roads tand no public facilities in the Grey Peaks National Park. Due to the steep terrain, the area has not been logged and contains a mixture of sclerophyll and rainforest vegetation. The sclerophyll forest contains red mahogany Eucalyptus pellita and red turpentine Syncarpia glomulifera trees.

Apart from these protected areas, the land in the locality is almost entirely used to grow sugarcane. There is a network of cane tramways  in the western part of the locality to transport the harvested sugarcane to the Mulgrave Sugar Mill.

The hill is the remnant of a volcano that erupted about 15,000 years ago. It is believed that the volcano's eruption altered the course of the Mulgrave River so that instead of having its mouth on Trinity Inlet, the mouth become directly onto the Coral Sea some 40 km further south. However, further research has shown river sediments above the basalt flows and it is now believed that other factors such as alluvial sediments may have altered the river's course and that perhaps it has alternated between the two mouths over time.

History 
Green Hill is situated in the Yidinji traditional Aboriginal country. 

The locality was originally called Crescent Hill, but was renamed Green Hill around the 1890s.

Education 
There are no schools in the locality. The nearest primary and secondary schools are Gordonvale State School and Gordonvale State High School both in neighbouring Gordonvale to the south-west.

References 

Cairns Region
Localities in Queensland